Lindsay Jennerich (born 30 July 1982) is a Canadian rower. A world champion in the lightweight double sculls with Tracy Cameron, she competed in the lightweight double sculls at both the 2012 Summer Olympics and 2016 Summer Olympics, winning a silver medal in 2016 with Patricia Obee.

Career 
In 2010, Jennerich and Tracy Cameron won gold in the women's lightweight double sculls at the 2010 World Championships.  Jennerich had previously competed in the women's lightweight single sculls and had won World Championship medals at under 23 level in the lightweight double sculls with Lysanne Lavigne, and in the women's eights at junior level.  Jennerich switched to the lightweight rowing category while at the University of Victoria, after realising her frame was not suitable for "heavyweight" rowing at national and international level.  She had rowed since high school.  At the university, she studied kinesiology.

Jennerich teamed up with Patricia Obee in the women's lightweight double sculls in 2011, after Jennerich's previous teammate, Tracy Cameron, was injured.  

Together Obee and Jennerich won silver at the 2011 World Rowing Championships.  The team competed in the lightweight double sculls at the 2012 Summer Olympics finishing in 7th place.

In 2013, Jennerich briefly dropped out of rowing, before returning to compete with Obee the lightweight double scull.  The team went on to win silver at the 2014 World Championships.  At the Rio 2016 Summer Olympics, Obee won a silver medal in the lightweight doubles, also with Lindsay Jennerich.

In June 2016, she was officially named to Canada's 2016 Olympic team, and she won a silver medal in lightweight double sculls at the 2016 Summer Olympics.  After the Olympics, she became a university rowing coach.

References

 

1982 births
Living people
Canadian female rowers
Rowers from Victoria, British Columbia
Rowers at the 2012 Summer Olympics
Olympic rowers of Canada
World Rowing Championships medalists for Canada
Rowers at the 2016 Summer Olympics
Olympic silver medalists for Canada
Olympic medalists in rowing
Medalists at the 2016 Summer Olympics
21st-century Canadian women